Peter Adam Emelianchik, (born November 19, 1943) is a retired American football player. Emelianchik is one of two players to have played football at Abraham Lincoln High School in Brooklyn and reach the National Football League.

Football career 
Emelianchik played tight end for the Dodge City Junior College Conquistadors in 1961 and 1962, and was voted Junior College All American in 1962. He then played for the University of Richmond Spiders in 1963 and 1964. Emelianchik was voted all-Southern Conference at end as a junior in 1963, but was injured during his senior year and not drafted by any NFL teams.

After football 
After his football career ended, Emelianchik taught physical education at James J. Reynolds Jr. High School in Brooklyn, NY. In 2017, he was inducted into the Dodge City Junior College Athletics Hall of Fame.

References

External links
 

1943 births
Living people
American people of Ukrainian descent
Sportspeople from Brooklyn
Players of American football from New York City
American football tight ends
Abraham Lincoln High School (Brooklyn) alumni
Richmond Spiders football players
Philadelphia Eagles players